Amritsar Central railway station (station code: ASR) is a railway located in Amritsar district in the Indian state of Punjab and serves Amritsar. It is the largest and busiest railway station of Punjab.

History
The Scinde, Punjab & Delhi Railway completed the Multan–Lahore–Amritsar line in 1865. The Amritsar–Attari section was completed on the route to Lahore in 1862.

The -long Amritsar–Khem Karan railway line runs through Tarn Taran and Patti.

A -long line links Amritsar to Dera Baba Nanak on the bank of the Ravi.

The  Amritsar–Pathankot route runs through Batala and Gurdaspur. The  broad gaugeAmritsar–Pathankot line was opened in 1884.

Overview
With this, it has become the busiest railway station of the state in terms of passenger movement and train traffic. In the 2016 railway budget, the government has aimed to beautify the railway station as it is the main station of the holy city. The railway station is the first and only with WiFi in the division and CCTV has recently been enabled. In the recent railway budget, it has been mentioned that Amritsar Junction will be improved due to its importance in various fields. The Movement Control Office (MCO) for Armed Forces is also available at PF no 1.

There are ten platforms under use, 1(A), 1(B), 1, 2, 3, 4, 5, 6, 7 and 8. Platform no. 8 is used for freight trains. Platform no. 1(B) is reserved exclusively for freight and passenger trains of Indian Army.

Electrification
The Phagwara–Jallandhar City–Amritsar sector was electrified in 2003–04.

Development
Amritsar became the first railway station in the state to be WiFi-enabled. With this announcement, concerns have also been raised around increasing the capacity of the railway station from the current 6 platforms to 8 platforms and base this on the standards of the International Airport. This is due to the fact that it is the most important and busiest railway terminus of the state. Two more escalators would be installed in the station from Platform 5, as Platform 1 has already two.

Platform No. 6 and 7 are started in January 2018 because of due to large movement of passengers in the city.

Upcoming projects
The electrification work is under progress on the Amritsar–Khemkaran line. This is because, a new rail line has been passed by the railways from Patti, Punjab to Ferozpur which will reduce the distance of Amritsar from Ferozpur by 80 km.
This will also reduces the distance and save the time to visit Rajasthan and Gujarat from Northern cities.

It has been planned to run Express trains on this route.

In December 2019, it has been announced that Bhagtanwala railway station and Chheharta railway station will be converted into satellite stations. Due to this the burden on Amritsar Junction railway station can be reduced.

Railway workshop
Amritsar railway workshop carries out a periodic overhaul of WDS-4 locos and breakdown cranes and bogie manufacture.

References

External links
 
 

Railway stations in Amritsar district
Firozpur railway division
Transport in Amritsar
Railway stations opened in 1862
1862 establishments in India
Indian Railway A1 Category Stations